Akhvor Sar (also Romanized as Ākhvor Sar; also known as Ākhvor Kolā) is a village in Mazkureh Rural District, in the Central District of Sari County, Mazandaran Province, Iran. At the 2006 census, its population was 380, in 99 families.

References 

Populated places in Sari County